Nakherchi Bolaghi (also Romanized as Nākherchī Bolāghī) is a village in Gavdul-e Sharqi Rural District, in the Central District of Malekan County, East Azerbaijan Province, Iran. At the 2006 census, its population was 40, in 9 families.

References 

Populated places in Malekan County